Boogiepop wa Warawanai may refer to:
 Boogiepop and Others is a novel written by Kouhei Kadono
 Boogiepop and Others is a movie directed by Ryu Kaneda
 Boogiepop Phantom is an anime by Madhouse
 Boogiepop Doesn't Laugh is a manga by written by Kouhei Kadono and illustrated by Kouji Ogata